Pipestone Pass is a mountain pass in the Rocky Mountains of Montana in the United States.   It sits on the Continental Divide in Silver Bow County, Montana, 10 miles south of Butte, Montana in Beaverhead-Deerlodge National Forest at an elevation of 6,453 ft (1,967 m).  

The Chicago, Milwaukee, St. Paul and Pacific Railroad (commonly known as the Milwaukee Road) used the pass for its crossing of the Continental Divide on its mainline between Chicago, Illinois and the Pacific Northwest. The line was built as part of the Milwaukee Road's Pacific Extension, which was completed in 1909. The railroad line cut under the pass via the 2,290 ft Pipestone Pass Tunnel at an elevation of 6,347 ft (1,935 m). The line was electrified in 1915 and served the Milwaukee Road's premium transcontinental passenger train, the Olympian (later the Olympian Hiawatha). A poor competitive position against the rival Burlington Northern Railroad and substantial losses caused the Milwaukee Road to abandon the line in 1980.

Pipestone Pass was also used (without a tunnel) as the Continental Divide crossing for U.S. Highway 10, dating from 1926. This road is now designated as Montana Highway 2 and known locally as "The Harding Way", the name being coined in honor of President Warren G. Harding on the occasion of his visit to Butte.

A trail running race currently takes place annually on the Continental Divide Trail between Pipestone Pass and Homestake Pass. Hosted by Butte's Piss and Moan Running Club, the Wulfman CDT 14k is held on the Saturday closest to the Summer solstice.

See also
 Mountain passes in Montana

Mountain passes of Montana
Great Divide of North America
Landforms of Silver Bow County, Montana
Rail mountain passes of the United States